Oybont is a rural locality (a settlement) in Khorinsky District, Republic of Buryatia, Russia. The population was 71 as of 2010. There is 1 street.

Geography 
Oybont is located 115 km northwest of Khorinsk (the district's administrative centre) by road. Tokhoryukta is the nearest rural locality.

References 

Rural localities in Khorinsky District